Robin Francis Leigh Oakley, OBE (born 20 August 1941) is a British journalist from Kidderminster in Worcestershire. From 2000 to 2008 he was European Political Editor at CNN International. From 1992 to 2000 he was Political Editor at the BBC.

Early life
Oakley was educated at Wellington College, Berkshire, and Brasenose College, Oxford.

Career
He started his career on the Liverpool Daily Post where he became Political Editor. He was then the Crossbencher columnist and assistant editor on The Sunday Express and was assistant editor of the Daily Mail from 1981 to 1986. Between 1986 and 1992, he was a columnist and political editor for The Times. He then moved to the BBC, where he was Political Editor between 1992 and 2000. During this period he regularly presented political news items on BBC television news. His predecessor as BBC Political Editor was John Cole, and he was succeeded in 2000 by Andrew Marr. After leaving the BBC, Oakley became CNN's European Political Editor. He is also an expert in horse racing, and has written the Turf column in The Spectator since 1994, as well as being the racing correspondent of the Financial Times for several years.

Author
His 2000 book "Valley of The Racehorse" is a story of the racing community in the Lambourn valley. His 2001 book Inside Track is based on his experiences as a political journalist.

Honours
He was awarded an OBE in 2001 for his services to political journalism.

Bibliography

References

External links 
 
 Robin Oakley retires early from the BBC

Alumni of Brasenose College, Oxford
BBC newsreaders and journalists
British political journalists
Officers of the Order of the British Empire
People educated at Wellington College, Berkshire
1941 births
Living people
CNN people
People from Kidderminster